Shawn Yue Man-lok (born 13 November 1981) is a Hong Kong actor and singer. A former model, he has starred in many films, such as Jiang Hu, Infernal Affairs II,  the Love in the Buff film series, Mad World and The Brink, and has established himself as a recognisable face in Hong Kong cinema.

Early life 
Yue was born and raised in Hong Kong, with roots in Taishan, Guangdong. He was spotted at a young age on the streets of Hong Kong by agents of the modelling agency Starz People and began his modelling career on a part-time basis. Upon graduating from Grade 16, he proceed to full-time modeling. He has since modeled for brands such as Giordano, Sony, Timberland, Gillette, Meko and was a spokesperson for Shiseido Pureness and Coca-Cola China.

Career 
Being a full-time model for several years, Yue turned his career and headed for the Hong Kong entertainment industry. From there, he starred in several movies and gained fame from his first role in Leaving Sorrowly (2001). 2005 was also a great year for Yue who portrayed Takeshi Nakazato in the film Initial D. According to the latest media release, Yue only appeared for less than half an hour in the film. However, despite the short appearance, his portrayal of Nakazato managed to leave a deep impression and impact on a lot of the viewers’ hearts, especially in Japan, where this has resulted directly in many new Japanese fans in Yue and a new lucrative market has been opened for Yue to conquer. 

Yue has also released four albums, the first being in 2002. He worked with Japanese music superstar Ayumi Hamasaki in 2007, starring as her love interest in the promotional videos for "glitter" and "fated", which together comprise the Wong Hoi-directed short film Kyoai ~Distance Love~.

Filmography

Film

Television series

Variety and reality show

Music video appearances

Discography

Studio albums

Extended plays

Singles

Awards and nominations

References

External links

1981 births
Living people
Hong Kong male singers
Hong Kong male film actors
Hong Kong male television actors
Cantopop singers
Hong Kong male models
21st-century Hong Kong male actors
Hong Kong expatriates in Taiwan